Oh Yeah is a studio album by the American jazz bassist and composer Charles Mingus, released in April 1962 by Atlantic Records. It was recorded in 1961, and features Mingus (usually known to play bass) singing on three of the cuts and playing piano throughout.

Track listing
All compositions by Charles Mingus.

"Hog Callin' Blues" – 7:27
"Devil Woman" – 9:42
"Wham Bam Thank You Ma'am" – 4:43
"Ecclusiastics" – 6:59
"Oh Lord Don't Let Them Drop That Atomic Bomb on Me" – 5:43
"Eat That Chicken" – 4:38
"Passions of a Man" – 4:56

The 1999 Rhino CD reissue included three additional tracks recorded at the same session (and previously released on Tonight at Noon in 1964):

"'Old' Blues for Walt's Torin"  – 7:58
"Peggy's Blue Skylight"  – 9:49
"Invisible Lady"  – 4:48

The 1988 Atlantic CD reissue included only one additional track, a 24-minute excerpt of an interview with Mingus conducted by Nesuhi Ertegün which was discovered in 1987. The full 77-minute interview appears as a bonus disc on the box set Passions of a Man: the Complete Atlantic Recordings (1956-1961).

Personnel
 Charles Mingus – piano and vocals
 Rahsaan Roland Kirk – flute, siren, tenor saxophone, manzello, and stritch
 Booker Ervin – tenor saxophone
 Jimmy Knepper – trombone
 Doug Watkins – bass
 Dannie Richmond – drums

Technical personnel
 Nesuhi Ertegün – producer
 Tom Dowd – recording engineer
 Phil Lehle – recording engineer

References

1962 albums
Albums produced by Nesuhi Ertegun
Atlantic Records albums
Charles Mingus albums